The Christ Pantocrator of St. Catherine's Monastery at Sinai is one of the oldest Byzantine religious icons, dating from the 6th century AD. It is the earliest known depiction of Jesus Christ as Pantocrator (literally ruler of all) that survives. It is regarded by historians and scholars to be one of the most important and recognizable works in the study of Byzantine art as well as Eastern Orthodox and Eastern Catholic Christianity.

Background 

For a time, the icon was thought to have been dated from the thirteenth century, since it had been almost completely painted over at that time. It was concluded in 1962 that it is from the mid-sixth century, although the exact date of production is still unknown. When Saint Catherine's Monastery was founded by the Byzantine emperor Justinian I, late in his reign, between 548 and 565, it enjoyed imperial patronage and donations from Justinian and his court, with the Christ Pantocrator icon having been one of the many possible imperial gifts. Because of this, it is generally believed to have been produced in the Byzantine capital of Constantinople.

Interpretation and meaning 

Many agree that the icon represents the dual nature of Christ, illustrating traits of both man and God, perhaps influenced by the aftermath of the ecumenical councils of the previous century at Ephesus and Chalcedon. Christ's features on his left side (the viewer's right) are supposed to represent the qualities of his human nature, while his right side (the viewer's left) represents his divinity. His right hand is shown opening outward, signifying his gift of blessing, while the left hand and arm is clutching a thick Gospel book.

Some scholars have suggested the icon at Sinai could have been a possible representation of the Kamouliana icon of Christ or of the famous icon of Christ of the Chalke Gate, an image which was destroyed twice during the first and second waves of Byzantine Iconoclasmfirst in 726, and again in 814and thus its connection with the Christ Pantocrator is difficult to confirm.

Description and production 

With a height of 84 cm, width of 45.5 cm, and a thickness of 1.2 cm, the icon was originally taller and wider before its top and sides were cut. Otherwise, there is only one spot with major damage, a large portion of Christ's hair on his left side, including his left ear and shoulder. The original encaustic surface has continually been preserved in excellent condition overall. 

As with many of the early icons from Sinai, the Christ Pantocrator was created by using this technique, known as encaustic—a medium using hot wax paint—that was rarely used in the Byzantine world after the iconoclastic controversies of the eighth and ninth centuries. The monastery at Sinai is the only place in the world where a substantial number of these encaustic icons, particularly those dating from as early as the sixth century, have been preserved. During the period of Byzantine Iconoclasm, the production of Orthodox icons continued at Sinai, whereas they were being destroyed in Constantinople.

Survival from Byzantine Iconoclasm and aftermath 
The Muslim Arabs quickly took control of the entire Levant south of the Turkish mountains, including Egypt and Sinai, cutting the monastery's ties with Constantinople in the year 640. Therefore, by the time the era of iconoclasm had been initiated by Emperor Leo III in 726, the Monastery of Saint Catherine had already been protected under Muslim rule for nearly a century and was able to survive the destruction of iconoclasm. Furthermore, the location of the monastery in the rocky desert of Sinai, far away from any major trade or military route, kept the contents within St. Catherine's safe from raiders as well as conquering armies. Today, the monastery houses more than 2,000 icons, dating from the sixth century to modern times.

Notes

Bibliography 

Chatzidakis, Manolis and Walters, Gerry. “An Encaustic Icon of Christ at Sinai.” The Art Bulletin 49, No. 3 (1967): 197–208.
Cormack, Robin. Oxford History of Art: Byzantine Art. Oxford: Oxford University Press, 2000.
Galey, John, Forsyth, George, and Weitzmann, Kurt. Sinai and the Monastery of St. Catherine, Doubleday, New York, 1980, 
Manaphēs, Kōnstantinos A. Sinai: Treasures of the Monastery of Saint Catherine. Athens: Ekdotike Athenon, 1990.
Weitzmann, Kurt. “The Mosaic in St. Catherine’s Monastery on Mount Sinai.” Proceedings of the American Philosophical Society 110, No. 6 (Dec. 1966): 392–405.
Weitzmann, Kurt. The Monastery of Saint Catherine at Mount Sinai, the Icons. Princeton, N.J.: Princeton University Press, 1976.

Further reading 
Coleman, Simon and Elsner, John. "The Pilgrim's Progress: Art, Architecture and Ritual Movement at Sinai". World Archaeology 26, No. 1 (1994): 73–89.
Nelson, Robert S., Collins, Kristen M., and J. Paul Getty Museum. Holy Image, Hallowed Ground: Icons from Sinai. Los Angeles: J. Paul Getty Museum, 2006.

Byzantine icons
6th-century paintings
Paintings depicting Jesus
Justinian I
Saint Catherine's Monastery
Paintings in Egypt
Books in art